Ren Ren Le is a supermarket chain based in Shenzhen, China.

Founded in April 1996, the supermarket chain has supermarkets in numerous Chinese cities, including Shenzhen and Xiamen, where a new 12,000 square meters store was opened in 2010.

As of 2008, Ren Ren Le had opened about one hundred hypermarkets and community supermarkets in 23 Chinese cities in the southern area, northwestern area, southwestern area and north area of China. In 2008, the company had an annual revenue of over CNY6 billion.

As of March 2016, Ren Ren Le had 24 outlets in Shenzhen alone.

References 

Supermarkets of China
Companies based in Shenzhen
Retail companies established in 1996
1996 establishments in China